In algebraic geometry, the motivic zeta function of a smooth algebraic variety  is the formal power series

Motivic measures 

A motivic measure is a map  from the set of finite type schemes over a field  to a commutative ring , satisfying the three properties
.

If the ground field is the complex numbers, then Euler characteristic with compact supports defines a motivic measure with values in the integers.

The zeta function with respect to a motivic measure  is the formal power series in  given by
.

There is a universal motivic measure.  It takes values in the K-ring of varieties, which is the ring generated by the symbols , for all varieties , subject to the relations
. 
The universal motivic measure gives rise to the motivic zeta function.

Examples 

Let  denote the class of the affine line.

 
where  is a polynomial of degree .  Thus, in this case, the motivic zeta function is rational.  In higher dimension, the motivic zeta function is not always rational.

If  is a smooth surface over an algebraically closed field of characteristic , then the generating function for the motives of the Hilbert schemes of  can be expressed in terms of the motivic zeta function by Göttsche's Formula

For the affine plane this formula gives

This is essentially the partition function.

Functions and mappings
Algebraic geometry